Volfířov is a municipality and village in Jindřichův Hradec District in the South Bohemian Region of the Czech Republic. It has about 700 inhabitants.

Administrative parts
Villages of Brandlín, Lipová, Poldovka, Radlice, Řečice, Šach and Velká Lhota are administrative parts of Volfířov.

References

Villages in Jindřichův Hradec District